Marathi (Marāṭhī, मराठी ) is an Indo-Aryan language predominantly spoken by Marathi people in the Indian state of Maharashtra. It is the official language of Maharashtra, and additional official language in the state of Goa. It is one of the 22 scheduled languages of India, with 83 million speakers as of 2011. Marathi ranks 13th in the list of languages with most native speakers in the world. Marathi has the third largest number of native speakers in India, after Hindi and Bengali. The language has some of the oldest literature of all modern Indian languages. The major dialects of Marathi are Standard Marathi and the Varhadi dialect.

Marathi distinguishes inclusive and exclusive forms of 'we' and possesses a three-way gender system, that features the neuter in addition to the masculine and the feminine.

History 

Indian languages, including Marathi, that belong to the Indo-Aryan language family are derived from early forms of Prakrit. Marathi is one of several languages that further descend from Maharashtri Prakrit. Further changes led to the formation of Jain Apabhraṃśa followed by Old Marathi.
However, this is challenged by Bloch (1970), who states that Apabhraṃśa was formed after Marathi had already separated from the Middle Indian dialect.

The earliest example of Maharashtri as a separate language dates to approximately 1st century BCE: a stone inscription found in a cave at Naneghat, Junnar in Pune district had been written in Maharashtri using Brahmi script. A committee appointed by the Maharashtra State Government to get the Classical status for Marathi has claimed that Marathi existed at least 1,500 - 2,000 years ago alongside Sanskrit as a sister language. Marathi, a derivative of Maharashtri Prakrit language, is probably first attested in a 739 CE copper-plate inscription found in Satara. Several inscriptions dated to the second half of the 11th century feature Marathi, which is usually appended to Sanskrit or Kannada in these inscriptions. The earliest Marathi-only inscriptions are the ones issued during the Shilahara rule, including a c. 1012 CE stone inscription from Akshi taluka of Raigad district, and a 1060 or 1086 CE copper-plate inscription from Dive that records a land grant (agrahara) to a Brahmin. A 2-line 1118 CE Marathi inscription at Shravanabelagola records a grant by the Hoysalas. These inscriptions suggest that Marathi was a standard written language by the 12th century. However, there is no record of any literature produced in Marathi until the late 13th century.

Yadava period 

After 1187 CE, the use of Marathi grew substantially in the inscriptions of the Yadava kings, who earlier used Kannada and Sanskrit in their inscriptions. Marathi became the dominant language of epigraphy during the last half century of the dynasty's rule (14th century), and may have been a result of the Yadava attempts to connect with their Marathi-speaking subjects and to distinguish themselves from the Kannada-speaking Hoysalas.

Further growth and usage of the language was because of two religious sects – the Mahanubhava and Varkari panthans – who adopted Marathi as the medium for preaching their doctrines of devotion. Marathi was used in court life by the time of the Yadava kings. During the reign of the last three Yadava kings, a great deal of literature in verse and prose, on astrology, medicine, Puranas, Vedanta, kings and courtiers were created. Nalopakhyana, Rukminiswayamvara and Shripati's Jyotisharatnamala (1039) are a few examples.

The oldest book in prose form in Marathi, Vivēkasindhu, was written by Mukundaraja, a Nath yogi and arch-poet of Marathi. Mukundaraja bases his exposition of the basic tenets of the Hindu philosophy and the yoga marga on the utterances or teachings of Shankaracharya. Mukundaraja's other work, Paramamrta, is considered the first systematic attempt to explain the Vedanta in the Marathi language

Notable examples of Marathi prose are "", events and anecdotes from the miracle-filled the life of Chakradhar Swami of the Mahanubhava sect compiled by his close disciple, Mahimbhatta, in 1238. The Līḷācarītra is thought to be the first biography written in the Marathi language. Mahimbhatta's second important literary work is the Shri Govindaprabhucharitra or Ruddhipurcharitra, a biography of Shri Chakradhar Swami's guru, Shri Govind Prabhu. This was probably written in 1288. The Mahanubhava sect made Marathi a vehicle for the propagation of religion and culture. Mahanubhava literature generally comprises works that describe the incarnations of gods, the history of the sect, commentaries on the Bhagavad Gita, poetical works narrating the stories of the life of Krishna and grammatical and etymological works that are deemed useful to explain the philosophy of sect.

Medieval and Deccan Sultanate period
The 13th century Varkari saint Dnyaneshwar (1275–1296) wrote a treatise in Marathi on Bhagawat Gita popularly called Dnyaneshwari and Amrutanubhava.

Mukund Raj was a poet who lived in the 13th century and is said to be the first poet who composed in Marathi. He is known for the Viveka-Siddhi and Parammruta which are metaphysical, pantheistic works connected with orthodox Vedantism.

The 16th century saint-poet Eknath (1528–1599) is well known for composing the Eknāthī Bhāgavat, a commentary on Bhagavat Purana and the devotional songs called Bharud. Mukteshwar translated the Mahabharata into Marathi; Tukaram (1608–49) transformed Marathi into a rich literary language. His poetry contained his inspirations. Tukaram wrote over 3000 abhangs or devotional songs.

Marathi was widely used during the Sultanate period. Although the rulers were Muslims, the local feudal landlords and the revenue collectors were Hindus and so was the majority of the population. To simplify administration and revenue collection, the sultans promoted use of Marathi in official documents. However, the Marathi language from the era is heavily Persianised in its vocabulary. The Persian influence continues to this day with many Persian derived words used in everyday speech such as bāg (Garden), kārkhānā (factory), shahar (city), bāzār (market), dukān (shop), hushār (clever), kāḡaḏ (paper), khurchi (chair), jamin (land), jāhirāt (advertisement), and hazār (thousand) Marathi also became language of administration during the Ahmadnagar Sultanate. Adilshahi of Bijapur also used Marathi for administration and record keeping.

Maratha Empire
Marathi gained prominence with the rise of the Maratha Empire beginning with the reign of Chhatrapati Shivaji Maharaj. In his court, Shivaji Maharaj replaced Persian, the common courtly language in the region, with Marathi.The Marathi language used in administrative documents also became less persianised. Whereas in 1630, 80% of the vocabulary was Persian, it dropped to 37% by 1677..His reign stimulated the deployment of Marathi as a tool of systematic description and understanding.  Shivaji Maharaj commissioned one of his officials to make a comprehensive lexicon to replace Persian and Arabic terms with their Sanskrit equivalents. This led to production of ‘Rājavyavahārakośa’, the thesaurus of state usage in 1677. Subsequent Maratha rulers extended the empire northwards to Peshawar, eastwards to Odisha, and southwards to Thanjavur in Tamil Nadu. These excursions by the Marathas helped to spread Marathi over broader geographical regions. This period also saw the use of Marathi in transactions involving land and other business. Documents from this period, therefore, give a better picture of the life of common people. There are a number of Bakhars (journals or narratives of histoical events)n written in Marathi and Modi script from this period. 

In the 18th century during Peshwa rule, some well-known works such as Yatharthadeepika by Vaman Pandit, Naladamayanti Swayamvara by Raghunath Pandit, Pandava Pratap, Harivijay, Ramvijay by Shridhar Pandit and Mahabharata by Moropant were produced. Krishnadayarnava and Sridhar were poets during the Peshwa period. New literary forms were successfully experimented with during the period and classical styles were revived, especially the Mahakavya and Prabandha forms. The most important hagiographies of Varkari Bhakti saints were written by Mahipati in the 18th century.
Other well known literary scholars of the 17th century were Mukteshwar and Shridhar. Mukteshwar was the grandson of Eknath and is the most distinguished poet in the Ovi meter. He is most known for translating the Mahabharata and the Ramayana in Marathi but only a part of the Mahabharata translation is available and the entire Ramayana translation is lost. Shridhar Kulkarni came from the Pandharpur area and his works are said to have superseded the Sanskrit epics to a certain extent. This period also saw the development of Powada (ballads sung in honor of warriors), and Lavani (romantic songs presented with dance and instruments like tabla). Major poet composers of Powada and Lavani songs of the 17th and the 18th century were Anant Phandi, Ram Joshi and Honaji Bala.

British colonial period
The British colonial period starting in early 1800s saw standardisation of Marathi grammar through the efforts of the Christian missionary William Carey. Carey's dictionary had fewer entries and Marathi words were in Devanagari. Translations of the Bible were first books to be printed in Marathi. These translations by William Carey, the American Marathi mission and the Scottish missionaries led to the development of a peculiar pidginized Marathi called "Missionary Marathi” in the early 1800s. The most comprehensive Marathi-English dictionary was compiled by Captain James Thomas Molesworth and Major Thomas Candy in 1831. The book is still in print nearly two centuries after its publication.
The colonial authorities also worked on standardizing Marathi under the leadership of Molesworth and Candy. They used Brahmins of Pune for this task and adopted the Sanskrit dominated dialect spoken by the elite in the city as the standard dialect for Marathi.

The first Marathi translation of the New Testament was published in 1811 by the Serampore press of William Carey. The first Marathi newspaper called Durpan was started by Balshastri Jambhekar in 1832. Newspapers provided a platform for sharing literary views, and many books on social reforms were written. First Marathi periodical Dirghadarshan was started in 1840. 
The Marathi language flourished, as Marathi drama gained popularity. Musicals known as Sangeet Natak also evolved. Keshavasut, the father of modern Marathi poetry published his first poem in 1885. 
The late-19th century in Maharashtra saw the rise of essayist Vishnushastri Chiplunkar with his periodical, Nibandhmala that had essays that criticized social reformers like Phule and Gopal Hari Deshmukh. He also founded the popular Marathi periodical of that era called Kesari in 1881. Later under the editorship of Lokmanya Tilak, the newspaper was instrumental in spreading Tilak's nationalist and social views. Tilak was also opposed to intercaste marriage, particularly the match where an upper caste woman married a lower caste man.  Phule and Deshmukh also started their own periodicals, Deenbandhu and Prabhakar, that criticised the prevailing Hindu culture of the day. The 19th century and early 20th century saw several books published on Marathi grammar. Notable grammarians of this period were Tarkhadkar, A.K.Kher, Moro Keshav Damle, and R.Joshi

The first half of the 20th century was marked by new enthusiasm in literary pursuits, and socio-political activism helped achieve major milestones in Marathi literature, drama, music and film. Modern Marathi prose flourished: for example, N.C.Kelkar's biographical writings, novels of Hari Narayan Apte, Narayan Sitaram Phadke and V. S. Khandekar, Vinayak Damodar Savarkar's nationalist literature and plays of Mama Varerkar and Kirloskar. In folk arts, Patthe Bapurao wrote many lavani songs during the late colonial period.

Marathi since Indian independence

After Indian independence, Marathi was accorded the status of a scheduled language on the national level. In 1956, the then Bombay state was reorganized, which brought most Marathi and Gujarati speaking areas under one state. Further re-organization of the Bombay state on 1 May 1960, created the Marathi speaking Maharashtra and Gujarati speaking Gujarat state respectively. With state and cultural protection, Marathi made great strides by the 1990s. A literary event called Akhil Bharatiya Marathi Sahitya Sammelan (All-India Marathi Literature Meet) is held every year. In addition, the Akhil Bharatiya Marathi Natya Sammelan (All-India Marathi Theatre Convention) is also held annually. Both events are very popular among Marathi speakers.

Notable works in Marathi in the latter half of 20th century include Khandekar's Yayati, which won him the Jnanpith Award. Also Vijay Tendulkar's plays in Marathi have earned him a reputation beyond Maharashtra. P.L. Deshpande (popularly known as PuLa), Vishnu Vaman Shirwadkar, P.K. Atre, Prabodhankar Thackeray and Vishwas Patil are known for their writings in Marathi in the fields of drama, comedy and social commentary. Bashir Momin Kavathekar wrote Lavani's and folk songs for Tamasha artists.

In 1958 the term "Dalit literature" was used for the first time, when the first conference of Maharashtra Dalit Sahitya Sangha (Maharashtra Dalit Literature Society) was held at Mumbai, a movement inspired by 19th century social reformer, Jyotiba Phule and eminent dalit leader, Dr. Bhimrao Ambedkar. Baburao Bagul (1930–2008) was a pioneer of Dalit writings in Marathi. His first collection of stories, Jevha Mi Jat Chorali ("When I Stole My Caste"), published in 1963, created a stir in Marathi literature with its passionate depiction of a cruel society and thus brought in new momentum to Dalit literature in Marathi. Gradually with other writers like Namdeo Dhasal (who founded Dalit Panther), these Dalit writings paved way for the strengthening of Dalit movement. Notable Dalit authors writing in Marathi include Arun Kamble, Shantabai Kamble, Raja Dhale, Namdev Dhasal, Daya Pawar, Annabhau Sathe, Laxman Mane, Laxman Gaikwad, Sharankumar Limbale, Bhau Panchbhai, Kishor Shantabai Kale, Narendra Jadhav, Keshav Meshram, Urmila Pawar, Vinay Dharwadkar, Gangadhar Pantawane, Kumud Pawde and Jyoti Lanjewar.

In recent decades there has been a trend among Marathi speaking parents of all social classes in major urban areas of sending their children to English medium schools. There is some concern that this may lead to the marginalization of the language.

Geographic distribution 

Marathi is primarily spoken in Maharashtra and parts of neighbouring states of Gujarat (majorly in Vadodara, and amongst small amount of population in Surat), Madhya Pradesh (in the districts of Burhanpur, Betul, Chhindwara and Balaghat), Goa, Chhattisgarh, Tamil Nadu (in Thanjavur) and Karnataka (in the districts of Belagavi, Karwar, Bagalkote, Vijayapura, Kalaburagi and Bidar), Telangana, union-territories of Daman and Diu and Dadra and Nagar Haveli. The former Maratha ruled cities of Baroda, Indore, Gwalior, Jabalpur, and Tanjore have had sizable Marathi-speaking populations for centuries. Marathi is also spoken by Maharashtrian migrants to other parts of India and overseas. For instance, the people from western India who emigrated to Mauritius in the early 19th century also speak Marathi.

There were 83 million native Marathi speakers in India, according to the 2011 census, making it the third most spoken native language after Hindi and Bengali. Native Marathi speakers form 6.86% of India's population. Native speakers of Marathi formed 70.34% of the population in Maharashtra, 10.89% in Goa, 7.01% in Dadra and Nagar Haveli, 4.53% in Daman and Diu, 3.38% in Karnataka, 1.7% in Madhya Pradesh, and 1.52% in Gujarat.

International 
The following table is a list of the geographic distribution of Marathi speakers as it appears in the 2019 edition of Ethnologue, a language reference published by SIL International, which is based in the United States.

Status 
Marathi is the official language of Maharashtra and additional official language in the state of Goa. In Goa, Konkani is the sole official language; however, Marathi may also be used for all official purposes in any case. Marathi is included among the languages that stand apart of the Eighth Schedule of the Constitution of India, thus granting it the status of a "scheduled language". The Government of Maharashtra has submitted an application to the Ministry of Culture to grant classical language status to Marathi.

The contemporary grammatical rules described by Maharashtra Sahitya Parishad and endorsed by the Government of Maharashtra are supposed to take precedence in standard written Marathi. Traditions of Marathi Linguistics and the above-mentioned rules give special status to tatsamas, words adapted from Sanskrit. This special status expects the rules for tatsamas to be followed as in Sanskrit. This practice provides Marathi with a large corpus of Sanskrit words to cope with the demands of new technical words whenever needed.

In addition to all universities in Maharashtra, Maharaja Sayajirao University of Baroda in Vadodara, Osmania University in Hyderabad, Karnataka University in Dharwad, Gulbarga University in Kalaburagi, Devi Ahilya University in Indore and Goa University in Goa have special departments for higher studies in Marathi linguistics. Jawaharlal Nehru University (New Delhi) has announced plans to establish a special department for Marathi.

Marathi Day is celebrated on 27 February, the birthday of the poet Kusumagraj (Vishnu Vaman Shirwadkar).

Dialects 

Standard Marathi is based on dialects used by academics and the print media.

Indic scholars distinguish 42 dialects of spoken Marathi. Dialects bordering other major language areas have many properties in common with those languages, further differentiating them from standard spoken Marathi. The bulk of the variation within these dialects is primarily lexical and phonological (e.g. accent placement and pronunciation). Although the number of dialects is considerable, the degree of intelligibility within these dialects is relatively high.

Varhadi 

Varhadi (Varhādi) (वऱ्हाडी) or Vaidarbhi (वैदर्भी) is spoken in the Western Vidarbha region of Maharashtra.
In Marathi, the retroflex lateral approximant ḷ  is common, while sometimes in the Varhadii dialect, it corresponds to the palatal approximant y (IPA: [j]), making this dialect quite distinct. Such phonetic shifts are common in spoken Marathi and, as such, the spoken dialects vary from one region of Maharashtra to another.

Zadi Boli 
Zaadi Boli or Zhaadiboli is spoken in Zaadipranta (a forest rich region) of far eastern Maharashtra or eastern Vidarbha or western-central Gondwana comprising Gondia, Bhandara, Chandrapur, Gadchiroli and some parts of Nagpur of Maharashtra.

Zaadi Boli Sahitya Mandal and many literary figures are working for the conservation of this dialect of Marathi.

Southern Indian Marathi 
Thanjavur Marathi, Namadeva Shimpi Marathi, Arey Marathi (Telangana), Kasaragod (north Kerala) and Bhavsar Marathi are some of the dialects of Marathi spoken by many descendants of Maharashtrians who migrated to Southern India. These dialects retain the 17th-century basic form of Marathi and have been considerably influenced by the Dravidian languages after the migration. These dialects have speakers in various parts of Tamil Nadu, Andhra Pradesh and Karnataka.

Other 
 Thanjavur Marathi, spoken in Tanjore, Tamil Nadu
 Judæo-Marathi, spoken by the Bene Israel Jews
East Indian Marathi, spoken by the Indian Christian East Indian ethno-religious group

Other Marathi–Konkani languages and dialects spoken in Maharashtra include Maharashtrian Konkani, Malvani, Sangameshwari, Agri, Andh, Warli, Vadvali and Samavedi.

Phonology

Writing 

The Kadamba script and its variants have been historically used to write Marathi in the form of inscriptions on stones and copper plates. The Marathi version of Devanagari, called Balbodh, is similar to the Hindi Devanagari alphabet except for its use for certain words. Some words in Marathi preserve the schwa, which has been omitted in other languages which use Devanagari. For example, the word 'रंग' (colour) is pronounced as 'ranga' in Marathi & 'rang' in other languages using Devanagari, and 'खरं' (true), despite the anuswara, is pronounced as 'khara'. The anuswara in this case is used to avoid schwa deletion in pronunciation; most other languages using Devanagari show schwa deletion in pronunciation despite the presence of schwa in the written spelling. From the 13th century until the beginning of British rule in 19th century, Marathi was written in the Modi script for administrative purposes but in Devanagari for literature. Since 1950 it has been written in the Balbodh style of Devanagari. Except for Father Stephen's Krista Purana in the Latin script in the 1600s, Marathi has mainly been printed in Devanagari because William Carey, the pioneer of printing in Indian languages, was only able to print in Devanagari. He later tried printing in Modi but by that time, Balbodh Devanagari had been accepted for printing.

Devanagari 
Marathi is usually written in the Balbodh version of Devanagari script, an abugida consisting of 36 consonant letters and 16 initial-vowel letters. It is written from left to right. The Devanagari alphabet used to write Marathi is slightly different from the Devanagari alphabets of Hindi and other languages: there are additional letters in the Marathi alphabet and Western punctuation is used.

William Carey in 1807 Observed that as with other parts of India, a traditional duality existed in script usage between Devanagari for religious texts, and Modi for commerce and administration. 

Vowels

Vowel ligatures with Consonant क/ka

Consonants

It is written from left to right. Devanagari used to write Marathi is slightly different than that of Hindi or other languages. It uses additional vowels and consonants that are not found in other languages that also use Devanagari.

The Modi alphabet 

From the thirteenth century until 1950, Marathi, especially for business use, was written in the Modi alphabet, a cursive script designed for minimising the lifting of pen from paper while writing.

Consonant clusters in Devanagari 
In Devanagari, consonant letters by default come with an inherent schwa. Therefore,  will be 'təyāche', not 'tyāche'. To form 'tyāche', you will have to write it as  + , giving .

When two or more consecutive consonants are followed by a vowel then a jodakshar (consonant cluster) is formed. Some examples of consonant clusters are shown below:

  – tyāche – "his"
  – prastāva – "proposal"
  – vidyā – "knowledge"
  – myān – "Sheath/scabbard"
  – tvarā – "immediate/Quick"
  – mahattva – "importance"
  – phakta – "only"
  – bāhulyā – "dolls"
 कण्हेरी – kaṇherī – "oleander" (known for its flowers)
 न्हाणे – nhāṇe – "bathing"
 म्हणून – mhaṇūna – "therefore"
 तऱ्हा – taṟhā – "different way of behaving"
 कोल्हा – kolhā – "fox"
 केव्हा – kevhā – "when"
In writing, Marathi has a few digraphs that are rarely seen in the world's languages, including those denoting the so-called "nasal aspirates" (ṇh (ण्ह), nh (न्ह) and mh (म्ह)) and liquid aspirates (rh, ṟh, lh, and vh व्ह). Some examples are given above.

Eyelash reph/raphar 
The eyelash reph/raphar (रेफ/ रफार) (र्‍) exists in Marathi as well as Nepali. The eyelash reph/raphar (र्‍) is produced in Unicode by the sequence [ra र ] + [virāma ्] + [ZWJ] and [rra ऱ ]+ [virāma ्] + [ZWJ]. In Marathi, when ‘र’ is the first consonant of a consonant cluster and occurs at the beginning of a syllable, it is written as an eyelash reph/raphar.

Minimal pairs

Braille 
In February 2008, Swagat Thorat published India's first Braille newspaper, the Marathi Sparshdnyan, a news, politics and current affairs fort nightly magazine.

Grammar 

Marathi grammar shares similarities with other modern Indo-Aryan languages. Jain Acharya Hemachandra is the grammarian of Maharashtri Prakrit. The first modern book exclusively concerning Marathi grammar was printed in 1805 by William Carey.

Marathi employs agglutinative, inflectional and analytical forms. Unlike most other Indo-Aryan languages, Marathi has kept three grammatical genders: masculine, feminine and neuter. The primary word order of Marathi is subject–object–verb Marathi follows a split-ergative pattern of verb agreement and case marking: it is ergative in constructions with either perfective transitive verbs or with the obligative ("should", "have to") and it is nominative elsewhere. An unusual feature of Marathi, as compared to other Indo-European languages, is that it displays inclusive and exclusive we, common to the Austroasiatic and Dravidian languages. Numerous scholars have noted the existence of Dravidian linguistic patterns in the Marathi language.

Sharing of linguistic resources with other languages 

Marathi is primarily influenced by Prakrit, Maharashtri, and Apabhraṃśa. Formal Marathi draws literary and technical vocabulary from Sanskrit.
Marathi has also shared directions, vocabulary, and grammar with languages such as Indian Dravidian languages. Over a period of many centuries, the Marathi language and people have also come into contact with foreign languages such as Persian, Arabic, English romance languages such as French, Spanish, Portuguese and other European languages.

Morphology and etymology 

Spoken Marathi contains a high number of Sanskrit-derived (tatsama) words.  Such words are for example nantar (from nantara or after),  ( or complete, full, or full measure of something), ola (ola or damp),  ( or cause), puṣkaḷ (puṣkala or much, many), satat (satata or always), vichitra (vichitra or strange), svatah (svatah or himself/herself), prayatna (prayatna or effort, attempt), bhītī (from bhīti, or fear) and bhāṇḍe (bhāṇḍa or vessel for cooking or storing food). Other words ("tadbhavas") have undergone phonological changes from their Sanskrit roots, for example dār (dwāra or door), ghar (gṛha or house), vāgh (vyāghra or tiger), paḷaṇe (palāyate or to run away), kiti (kati or how many) have undergone more modification.
Examples of words borrowed from other Indian and foreign languages include:
 Hawā: "air" directly borrowed from Arabic hawa
 Jamin: "land" borrowed from Persian zamin
 Kaydā: "law" borrowed from Arabic qaeda 
 Jāhirāt: "advertisement" is derived from Arabic zaahiraat
 Marjī: "wish" is derived from Persian marzi
 Shiphāras: "recommendation" is derived from Persian sefaresh
 Hajērī: "attendance" from Urdu haziri 
 Aṇṇā: "father", "grandfather" or "elder brother" borrowed from Dravidian languages
 Undir: "rat" borrowed from Munda languages

A lot of English words are commonly used in conversation and are considered to be assimilated into the Marathi vocabulary. These include words like "pen" (पेन, pen) and "shirt" (शर्ट, sharṭa) whose native Marathi counterparts are lekhaṇī (लेखणी) and sadarā (सदरा) respectively.

Compounds
Marathi uses many morphological processes to join words together, forming compounds. For example, ati + uttam gives the word atyuttam, miith-bhaakar ("salt-bread"), udyog-patii ("businessman"), ashṭa-bhujaa ("eight-hands", name of a Hindu goddess).

Counting 
Like many other languages, Marathi uses distinct names for the numbers 1 to 20 and each multiple of 10, and composite ones for those greater than 20.

They are pāva, ardhā, and pāuṇa, respectively. For most fractions greater than 1, the prefixes savvā-, sāḍē-, pāvaṇe- are used.

Powers of ten are denoted by separate specific words as depicted in the table below.

A positive integer is read by breaking it up from the tens digit leftwards, into parts each containing two digits, the only exception being the hundreds place containing only one digit instead of two. For example, 1,234,567 is written as 12,34,567 and read as 12 lakh 34 Hazara 5 she 67 (१२ लाख ३४ हजार ५ शे ६७).

Every two-digit number after 18 (11 to 18 are predefined) is read backward. For example, 21 is read एक-वीस (1-twenty). Also, a two digit number that ends with a 9 is considered to be the next tens place minus one. For example, 29 is एकोणतीस (एक-उणे-तीस) (thirty minus one). Two digit numbers used before Hazara are written in the same way.

Marathi on computers and the Internet
Shrilipee, Shivaji, kothare 2,4,6, Kiran fonts KF-Kiran and many more (about 48) are clip fonts that were used prior to the introduction of Unicode standard for Devanagari script. Clip fonts are in vogue on PCs even today since most computers use English keyboards. Even today a large number of printed publications such as books, newspapers and magazines are prepared using these ASCII based fonts. However, clip fonts cannot be used on internet since those did not have Unicode compatibility.

Earlier Marathi suffered from weak support by computer operating systems and Internet services, as have other Indian languages. But recently, with the introduction of language localization projects and new technologies, various software and Internet applications have been introduced. Marathi typing software is widely used and display interface packages are now available on Windows, Linux and macOS. Many Marathi websites, including Marathi newspapers, have become popular especially with Maharashtrians outside India. Online projects such as the Marathi language Wikipedia, with 76,000+ articles, the Marathi blogroll, and Marathi blogs have gained immense popularity.

Natural language processing for Marathi

More recent attention has focused on developing natural language processing tools for Marathi. Some studies proposed a couple of text corpora for Marathi. L3CubeMahaSent is the first major publicly available Marathi dataset for sentiment analysis. It contains about 16,000 distinct tweets classified into three broad classes, such as positive, negative, and neutral. L3Cube-MahaNER
 is a dataset for named-entity recognition consisting of 25,000 manually tagged sentences categorized according to the eight entity classes. There are at least two public available datasets for hate speech detection in Marathi: L3Cube-MahaHate 
 and HASOC2021. 

The HASOC2021 dataset was proposed for conducting a machine learning competition on hate, offensive, and profane content identification in Marathi collocated with Forum for Information Retrieval Evaluation (FIRE 2021). The participants of the competition presented 25 solutions based on supervised learning. The winning teams used pre-trained language models (XLM-RoBERTa, Language Agnostic BERT Sentence Embeddings (LaBSE)) fine-tuned on the HASOC2021 dataset proposed by the organizers. The participants also experimented with the joint use of multilingual data for fine-tuning.

Marathi Language Day

Marathi Language Day (मराठी दिन/मराठी दिवस  is celebrated on 27 February every year across the Indian states of Maharashtra and Goa. This day is regulated by the Ministry of Marathi Language. It is celebrated on the Birthday of eminent Marathi Poet V.V. Shirwadkar, popularly known as Kusumagraj.

Essay competitions and seminars are arranged in schools and colleges, and government officials are asked to conduct various events.

Marathi words coined by Vinayak Savarkar

Vinayak Damodar Savarkar, an independence activist, noted Hindutva ideologue, writer, and poet, contributed to the Marathi language by coining new Marathi equivalents for words from other languages, mostly English. Prior to these Marathi equivalents, words of Persian, Turkic origin were widely used, which was unacceptable to Savarkar. He opined that foreign words polluted the Marathi language and also made original Marathi words with the same meanings obsolete. According to Deshpande, unlike Hindi, Savarkar's campaign of Bhasha Shuddhi to remove Arabic, Persian and Turkic words from Marathi was a failure. 

The following are some of the words coined by Savarkar:

 lecturer: प्रवाचक
 principal: प्राचार्य
 reader: प्रपथक
 washing centre: धवल केंद्र, निर्मल केंद्र, परित गृह 
 hair-cutting saloon: केशकर्तनालय
 buffer state: किलकराष्ट्र 
 number: क्रमांक
 date: दिनांक 
 up-to-date: अद्ययावत
 martyr: हुतात्मा 
plebiscite: सर्वमत 
 ultimatum: अंतीमोतर
 truce: उपसंधी
 telephone: दूरध्वनी
 loudspeaker: ध्वनिक्षेपक 
 teleprinter: दुर्मुद्रक
 mayor: महापौर

See also 

 Konkani language

References

Bibliography

 

 A Survey of Marathi Dialects. VIII. Gāwḍi, A. M. Ghatage & P. P. Karapurkar. The State Board for Literature and Culture, Bombay. 1972.
 Marathi: The Language and its Linguistic Traditions - Prabhakar Machwe, Indian and Foreign Review, 15 March 1985.
 'Atyavashyak Marathi Vyakaran' (Essential Marathi Grammar) - Dr. V. L. Vardhe
 'Marathi Vyakaran' (Marathi Grammar) - Moreshvar Sakharam More.
 'Marathi Vishwakosh, Khand 12 (Marathi World Encyclopedia, Volume 12), Maharashtra Rajya Vishwakosh Nirmiti Mandal, Mumbai
 'Marathyancha Itihaas' by Dr. Kolarkar, Shrimangesh Publishers, Nagpur
 'History of Medieval Hindu India from 600 CE to 1200 CE, by C. V. Vaidya
 Marathi Sahitya (Review of the Marathi Literature up to I960) by Kusumavati Deshpande, Maharashtra Information Centre, New Delhi

External links 

 

 Dictionaries
 Molesworth, J. T. (James Thomas). A dictionary, Marathi, and English. 2d ed., rev. and all. Bombay: Printed for government at the Bombay Education Society's press, 1857.
 Vaze, Shridhar Ganesh. The Aryabhusan school dictionary, Marathi-English. Poona: Arya-Bhushan Press, 1911.
 Tulpule, Shankar Gopal and Anne Feldhaus. A dictionary of old Marathi. Mumbai: Popular Prakashan, 1999.

 
Languages attested from the 11th century
Culture of Maharashtra
Official languages of India
Languages written in Devanagari
Southern Indo-Aryan languages
Subject–object–verb languages
Indo-Aryan languages
Languages of Maharashtra
Languages of Madhya Pradesh
Languages of Karnataka
Languages of Gujarat
Languages with own distinct writing systems
Languages officially written in Indic scripts
Sahitya Akademi recognised languages